Košarkaški klub Bor RTB, commonly referred to as KK Bor RTB, is a men's basketball club based in Bor, Serbia. It is part of the Bor's multi-sports club. It competes in the Second Basketball League of Serbia.

History
The biggest success in the club's history is reaching placement to the Second Yugoslavia League in 1977, after a 98–97 win over Partizan Jagodina.

Home arena
Bor RTB plays its home games at the Bor Sports Center. The hall is located in Bor, Eastern Serbia. It has a seating capacity of 3,000 seats.

Players

Head coaches 

 Dejan Aleksić (2019–2020)
 Miloš Nejkov (2020–present)

Trophies and awards

Trophies
 Second Regional League, East Division (4th-tier)
 Winners (1): 2016–17

References

External links
 Club Profile at eurobasket.com
 Club Profile at srbijasport.net

Basketball teams in Serbia
Basketball teams established in 1952
Basketball teams in Yugoslavia
Bor, Serbia
1952 establishments in Serbia